A  is a subdivision of certain Italian towns and cities. The best-known example is the sestieri of Venice, but Ascoli Piceno, Genoa, Milan and Rapallo, for example, were also divided into sestieri. The medieval Lordship of Negroponte, on the island of Euboea, was also at times divided into six districts, each with a separate ruler, through the arbitration of Venice, which were known as sestieri. The island of Crete, a Venetian colony (the "Kingdom of Candia") from the Fourth Crusade, was also divided into six parts, named after the sestieri of Venice herself, while the capital Candia retained the status of a comune of Venice. The island of Burano north of Venice is also subdivided into sestieri.

A variation of the word is occasionally found: the comune of Leonessa, for example, is divided into  or sixths.

Other Italian towns with fewer than six official districts are frequently divided into analogous quartieri (4, whence the English word "quarter" to mean a neighbourhood) or terzieri (3); some towns merely refer to these neighbourhoods by the non-number-specific rioni. , and their analogues are usually no longer administrative divisions of these towns, but historical and traditional communities, most often seen in their sharpest relief in the town's annual palio.

See also
 Frazione
 Località
 Circoscrizione
 Rione
Rioni of Rome
 Terziere
 Quartiere

Subdivisions of Italy